Hans Offerdal (23 September 1909 – 19 August 1980) was a Norwegian politician for the Labour Party.

He was born in Lærdal.

He was elected to the Norwegian Parliament from Sogn og Fjordane in 1958, and was re-elected on one occasion. He had previously been a deputy representative in the period 1945–1949, and later served in the same position from 1965–1969.

Offerdal was a member of Lærdal municipality council in the period 1945–1947 and of Leikanger municipality council in 1951–1955.

References

1909 births
1980 deaths
Labour Party (Norway) politicians
Members of the Storting
20th-century Norwegian politicians
People from Lærdal